Trnova  or  Trnová may refer to the following places:

Bosnia and Herzegovina
 Trnova, Sanski Most
 Trnova, Ugljevik

Czech Republic
Trnová (Prague-West District)
Trnová (Plzeň-North District)

See also
 Trnovo (disambiguation)